Zhang Zhifen (born 1966) is a major general (shaojiang) of the People's Liberation Army (PLA) currently serving as commander of the Jiuquan Satellite Launch Center. He is an alternate member of 19th Central Committee of the Chinese Communist Party.

Biography
Zhang was born in Shaodong, Hunan, in 1966.

He once served as chief of staff of the Xichang Satellite Launch Center. In July 2016, he was appointed commander of the Jiuquan Satellite Launch Center, succeeding Shang Hong.

References

1966 births
Living people
People from Shaodong
People's Liberation Army generals from Hunan
People's Republic of China politicians from Hunan
Chinese Communist Party politicians from Hunan
Alternate members of the 19th Central Committee of the Chinese Communist Party